The 2009 French Figure Skating Championships took place between 19 and 21 December 2008 in Colmar. Skaters competed in the disciplines of men's singles, ladies' singles, pair skating, ice dancing, and synchronized skating on the senior level. The results were one of the criteria used to choose the French teams to the 2009 World Championships and the 2009 European Championships.

The junior level synchronized championships were held during this competition; junior and novice level competitions for the other disciplines were held separately.

Senior results

Men

Ladies

Pairs

Ice dancing
There was no compulsory dance segment.

Synchronized

Junior results

Synchronized

External links
 2009 French Championships results

French Figure Skating Championships
2008 in figure skating
French Figure Skating Championships, 2009
Figure skating